Elucidarium (also Elucidarius, so called because it "elucidates the obscurity of various things") is an encyclopedic work or summa about medieval Christian theology and folk belief, originally written in the late 11th century by Honorius Augustodunensis, influenced by Anselm of Canterbury and John Scotus Eriugena. It was probably complete by 1098, as the latest work by Anselm that finds mention is Cur deus homo. This suggests that it is the earliest work by Honorius, written when he was a young man. It was intended as a handbook for the lower and less educated clergy. Valerie Flint (1975) associates its compilation with the 11th-century Reform of English monasticism.

Overview
The work  is set in the form of a Socratic dialogue between a disciple and his teacher, divided into three books. The first discusses God, the creation of angels and their fall, the creation of man and his fall and need for redemption, and the earthly life of Christ. The second book discusses the divine nature of Christ and the foundation of the Church at Pentecost, understood as the mystical body of Christ manifested in the Eucharist dispensed by the Church. The third book discusses Christian eschatology. Honorius embraces this last topic with enthusiasm, with the Antichrist, the Second Coming, the Last Judgement, Purgatory, the pains of Hell, and the joys of Heaven described in vivid detail.

The work was very popular from the time of its composition and remained so until the end of the medieval period. The work survives in more than 300 manuscripts of the Latin text (Flint 1995, p. 162). The theological topic is embellished with many loans from the native folklore of England, and was embellished further in later editions and vernacular translations. Written in the 1090s in England, it was translated into late Old English within a few years of its completion (Southern 1991, p. 37). It was frequently translated into vernaculars and survives in numerous disparate versions, from the 16th century also in print in the form of popular chapbooks. Later versions attributed the work to a "Master Elucidarius". A Provençal translation revises the text for compatibility with Catharism. An important early translation is that into Old Icelandic, dated to the late 12th century. The Old Icelandic translation survives in fragments in a manuscript dated to c. 1200 (AM 674 a 4to), one of the very earliest surviving Icelandic manuscripts. This Old Icelandic Elucidarius was an important influence on medieval Icelandic literature and culture, including the Snorra Edda.

The editio princeps of the Latin text is that of the Patrologia Latina, vol. 172 (Paris 1895).

Editions and translations

Modern editions and translations
 Lefèvre, Yves, L'Elucidarium et les Lucidaires, Bibliothèque des écoles Françaises d’Athènes et de Rome, 180 (Paris, 1954) (Latin with modern French translation)

Medieval translations
 High Middle Ages
 An Old Icelandic version of ca. 1200.
Ed. Evelyn Scherabon Firchow and Kaaren Grimstad, Elucidarius: in Old Norse translation, Stofnun Árna Magnússonar á Íslandi 36 (Reykjavík: Stofnun Árna Magnússonar, 1989).
 A thirteenth-century translation into Old French by the Dominican Jeffrey of Waterford
 A thirteenth-century translation into Middle High German, followed by a German-language ms. tradition of the 13th to 15th centuries 

 Late Middle Ages
 A Late Middle English translation of the fourteenth-century French, Second Lucidaire called The Lucidary
 A Provençal translation 
 A Middle Welsh version from the Llyvyr agkyr Llandewivrevi (Jesus college ms. 119, 1346)
Ed. J. Morris Jones and John Rhŷs, The Elucidarium and other tracts in Welsh from Llyvyr agkyr Llandewivrevi A.D. 1346 (Jesus college ms. 119) (Oxford: Clarendon Press, 1894)
 A fifteenth-century Czech translation 

 Sixteenth century
 Nuremberg, 1509.
 Nuremberg, 1512.
 Landshut, 1514.
 Vienna, 1515.
Hermannus Torrentinus, Dictionarivm poeticvm qvod vvlgo inscribitur Elucidarius carminum, apvd Michaellem Hillenium, 1536 ; Elucidarius poeticus : fabulis et historiis refertissimus, iam denuo in lucem, cum libello d. Pyrckheimeri de propriis nominibus civitatum, arcium, montium, aeditus, Imprint Basileae : per Nicolaum Bryling., 1542 
 Eyn newer M. Elucidarius, Strasbourg 1539

References

 Valerie I. J. Flint, The Elucidarius of Honorius Augustodunensis and Reform in Late Eleventh-Century England, in: Revue bénédictine 85 (1975), 178–189.
 Marcia L. Colish, Peter Lombard, Volume 1, vol. 41 of Brill's studies in intellectual history (1994), 37–42.
 Th. Ricklin, "Elucidarium"; in: Eckert, Michael; Herms, Eilert; Hilberath, Bernd Jochen; Jüngel, Eberhard eds.): Lexikon der theologischen Werke, Stuttgart 2003, 263/264.
 Gerhard Müller, Theologische Realenzyklopädie, Walter de Gruyter, 1993, p. 572.

1090s books
Christian apocalyptic writings
Christian theology books
Christian folklore
European folklore
11th-century Latin books